Amyris elemifera is a species of flowering plant in the citrus family, Rutaceae. Its common names include sea torchwood, smooth torchwood, candlewood, sea amyris, tea, cuabilla, and bois chandelle. It is native to Florida in the United States, the Caribbean, and the Central American countries of Guatemala, Belize, Honduras, and El Salvador. It is also known from northern South America. The species name elemifera is from the Greek, meaning "resin bearing".

Description
The smooth, gray bark matures into a rough and furrowed surface with plates. The wood is close-grained. The species has a vertical branching habit. It has a weak taproot, but the lateral roots are stiff and strong. The yellow-gray twigs turn gray with age. The hanging foliage is fragrant. The compound leaves are opposite or sub-opposite. A  petiole supports three to five oval or lance-shaped leaflets. The fragrant, globose drupe is black and contains a single brown seed. The tiny, fragrant white flowers and fruit attract wildlife such as birds.

Ecology
Sea torchwood tolerates full sun to light shade. In Florida, it often grows along the edges of hammocks. It tolerates many soil types, including soil over rock and coastal sand. It grows in well-drained sites, but it tolerates  of yearly precipitation in Puerto Rico. Young plants linger in the understory until gaps allow further growth.

In Florida, sea torchwood is a food source for the endangered Schaus' Swallowtail (Papilio aristodemus ponceanus).

Uses
This species has been used for fences, fuel, and honey production. The fine-grained, fragrant wood is resistant to dry wood termites. It is too scarce for common use. The plant has yielded taxaline, an oxazole with antibiotic activity against Mycobacterium.

References

elemifera
Trees of the Southeastern United States
Trees of the Caribbean
Trees of Guatemala
Trees of El Salvador
Trees of Belize
Trees of Honduras
Flora of northern South America
Plants described in 1759
Trees of the United States
Taxa named by Carl Linnaeus